"Get It On" is a song by Australian rock musician, Diesel. It was released in June 1995 as the third and final single from his third studio album, Solid State Rhyme  (1994). It peaked at number 75 in Australia in June 1995.

Track listing
CD single
 "Get It On" – 3:02
 "Mercurial Girl" – 3:21
 "Wrapping Paper" – 4:07

Charts

References

External links

EMI Records singles
1995 singles
1994 songs
Diesel (musician) songs
Songs written by Diesel (musician)